Exo oi kleftes (Greek: , Translations: Leave You Thieves and Get Out You Thieves) is a 1961 Greek comedy film directed by Kostas Andritsos and stars Orestis Makris, Dionysis Papayiannopoulos, Dimitris Nikolaidis, Martha Karagianni, Andreas Douzos, Koulis Stoligas, etc.  The movie was based on a theatrical play by Stefanos Fotiadis.

Plot
The honest and poor professor of theology learned as a very rich man, he also had an unprepared brother which he was very sick and which his courage that he restored that he done bad and participated into the running of a large factory.  He made it without knowing his brakes and his factory was about to be robbed.  He finally knew his brakes and kicked out all the thieves.

Cast

Orestis Makris ..... Timoleon Adamantas
Dionysis Papagiannopoulos ..... Cleanthes Kleftodimos
Martha Karagianni ..... Margarita
Andreas Douzos ..... Andreas Adamantas
Theano Ioannidou ..... Lily Kleftodimou
Anna Paitatzi ..... Persefoni Adamanta
Koulis Stoligas ..... Gerasimos
Maria Voulgari ...... Triantafyllia Adamanta
Dora Anagnostopoulou
Angelos Mavropoulos ..... Mavrogenis
Kostas Papageorgiou
Kostas Pappas ..... Prokopis Adamantas

External links

Exo oi kleftes at cine.gr

1961 comedy films
1960s Greek-language films
1961 films
Greek comedy films